Arnor Njøs (21 June 1930 – 1 May 2019) was a Norwegian soil scientist. Nimbast hoiste.

He was born in Leinstrand. He graduated from the Norwegian College of Agriculture in 1955, and took the M.Sc. degree at the University of Illinois in 1961. He was a professor at the Norwegian College of Agriculture from 1979 to 1989, serving as rector from 1984 to 1989, and headed the Norwegian Centre for Soil and Environmental Research from 1990 to 1995.

He was decorated as a Knight, First Class of the Order of St. Olav in 1997. In 1998 an honorary degree at the Swedish University of Agricultural Sciences was bestowed upon him. He died in 2019.

References

1930 births
2019 deaths
Norwegian soil scientists
Norwegian College of Agriculture alumni
Academic staff of the Norwegian College of Agriculture
Rectors of the Norwegian University of Life Sciences
University of Illinois alumni
People from Trondheim
20th-century Norwegian scientists
21st-century Norwegian scientists
20th-century Norwegian educators